Ptinus hystrix is a species of spider beetle in the family Ptinidae. It is found in North America.

References

Further reading

 
 

Ptinus
Articles created by Qbugbot
Beetles described in 1905